The 2005 Tranzam Sports Sedan Series was a national motor racing series sanctioned by the Confederation of Australian Motor Sport and open to drivers of:
 Sports Sedans complying with CAMS Group 3D regulations
 Transam cars complying with National Australian Sports Sedan Association regulations
 TraNZam cars complying with TRG of New Zealand regulations
 Australian Tranzam cars complying with National Australian Sports Sedan Association regulations

The series was contested over a five round series. 

Round 1, Phillip Island, Victoria, 22 May
Round 2, Queensland Raceway, Queensland, 3 July
Round 3, Eastern Creek Raceway, New South Wales, 24 July
Round 4, Oran Park Raceway, Sydney, New South Wales, 18 September
Round 5, Wakefield Park,  New South Wales, 13 November

Results

References

National Sports Sedan Series
Sports Sedan Series